Darah Serah Bavineh (also Romanized as Dārah Serah Bāvīneh; also known as Dārah Serah) is a village in Darb-e Gonbad Rural District, Darb-e Gonbad District, Kuhdasht County, Lorestan Province, Iran. At the 2006 census, its population was 136, in 29 families.

References 

Towns and villages in Kuhdasht County